Dizzy Gillespie at Newport is a 1957 live album by Dizzy Gillespie, featuring his big band, recorded at the 1957 Newport Jazz Festival.

Reception
The AllMusic review states: "This brilliant CD captures one of the high points of Dizzy Gillespie's remarkable career and is highly recommended."

Track listing
 "Dizzy's Blues" (A. K. Salim) – 11:51
 "School Days" (Will D. Cobb, Gus Edwards) – 5:47
 "Doodlin'" (Horace Silver) – 7:56
 "Manteca" (Gil Fuller, Gillespie, Chano Pozo) – 7:11
 "I Remember Clifford" (Benny Golson) – 4:48
 "Cool Breeze" (Tadd Dameron, Billy Eckstine, Gillespie) – 10:33
 "Zodiac Suite: Virgo/Libra/Aries" (Mary Lou Williams) – 10:28 Bonus track on CD reissue
 "Carioca" (Edward Eliscu, Gus Kahn, Vincent Youmans) – 3:41 Bonus track on CD reissue
 "A Night in Tunisia" (Gillespie, Frank Paparelli) – 10:00 Bonus track on CD reissue - Lee Morgan feature

Personnel
Dizzy Gillespie – trumpet, vocals, arranger (track 4)
Talib Dawud, Lee Morgan, Ermit V. Perry, Carl Warwick - trumpet
Chuck Connors, Al Grey, Melba Liston - trombone
Ernie Henry, Jimmy Powell - alto saxophone
Benny Golson - tenor saxophone, arranger (track 5)
Billy Mitchell - tenor saxophone
Pee Wee Moore - baritone saxophone
Wynton Kelly (tracks 1-6 & 9), Mary Lou Williams (tracks 7 & 8) - piano
 Paul E. West - double bass
Charlie Persip - drums
A. K. Salim (track 1), Tadd Dameron (track 6), Quincy Jones (track 2), Ernie Wilkins (track 3) - arranger

References

Dizzy Gillespie live albums
Albums produced by Norman Granz
Albums recorded at the Newport Jazz Festival
1957 live albums
1957 in Rhode Island
Verve Records live albums
Albums arranged by Tadd Dameron
Albums arranged by Quincy Jones
Albums arranged by Benny Golson
Albums arranged by Ernie Wilkins